These are  small black and yellow or mostly black flies with a narrow abdomen near the thorax.  They occur mainly in damp places among low herbage. The larva  of  Neosascia are flattened without oral hooks and a have a short posterior spiracular process or "tail" rat-tailed that is saprophagous. In 1925 Curran reviewed the genus Neoascia . In this work a key is provided and ten species are described including four new species some of which have later been determined to be synonyms.

Species

N. amurensis Mutin, 1993
N. anassa Reemer & Hippa, 2005
N. bipunctata (Matsumura, 1919)
N. clausseni Hauser & Kassebeer, 1998
N. confusa Mutin, 1993
N. distincta Williston, 1887
N. globosa (Walker, 1849)
N. guttata Skevington & Moran, 2019
N. inexpectata Hauser, 1998
N. nana Reemer & Hippa, 2005
N. subannexa Claussen & Hayat, 1997
N. willistoni Thompson, 1986

Subgenus: Neoascia
N. annexa (Müller, 1776)
N. balearensis Kassebeer, 2002
N. longiscutata (Shiraki, 1930)
N. metallica (Williston, 1882)
N. monticola Stackelberg, 1960
N. pavlovskii Stackelberg, 1955
N. podagrica (Fabricius, 1775)
N. sphaerophoria Curran, 1925
N. tenur (Harris, 1780)

Subgenus: Neoasciella
N. carinicauda Stackelberg, 1955
N. geniculata (Meigen, 1822)
N. interrupta (Meigen, 1822)
N. meticulosa (Scopoli, 1763)
N. obliqua Coe, 1940
N. subchalybea Curran, 1925
N. tuberculifera Violovitsh, 1957
N. unifasciata (Strobl, 1898)

References

Diptera of Europe
Diptera of North America
Diptera of Asia
Diptera of Africa
Hoverfly genera
Taxa named by Samuel Wendell Williston
Eristalinae